The 1888 Lake Forest Foresters football team represented Lake Forest College during the 1888 college football season.

Schedule

References

Lake Forest
Lake Forest Foresters football seasons
Lake Forest Foresters football